Bluesmith is a 1972 jazz album by Jimmy Smith, released on the Verve label.

Reception

Allmusic awarded the album four and a half stars, with reviewer Scott Yanow writing that it was "...ironic that one of Jimmy Smith's best Verve releases would be his next-to-last for the label." Yanow also commented that it was a "surprisingly freewheeling but relaxed jam session" and "Fine straight-ahead music."

Track listing
All compositions by Jimmy Smith unless otherwise noted
 "Straight Ahead" (Oliver Nelson, Jimmy Smith) - 5:25
 "Absolutely Funky" - 9:12
 "Lolita" - 6:23
 "Mournin' Wes" (Harvey Siders) - 10:00
 "Blues for 3+1" - 4:52
 "Bluesmith" - 6:41

Personnel
Jimmy Smith - Electronic organ
Teddy Edwards - tenor saxophone 
Ray Crawford - guitar
Leroy Vinnegar - double bass
Victor Pantoja - Congas
Donald Dean - drums
Production
Harvey Siders - liner notes
Ken Veeder - photography
Ed Greene, Louis Peters - engineer
Eric Miller - producer
Eddie Ray - executive producer

References

External links
Bluesmith at The Incredible Jimmy Smith site

1972 albums
Jimmy Smith (musician) albums
Verve Records albums